The Subah of Lahore was a province of the Mughal Empire encompassing the central Punjab region, now divided between Pakistan and India. It was created as one of the original 12 Subahs of the Mughal Empire under the administrative reforms carried by emperor Akbar in 1580. The province ceased to exist after the death of its last viceroy, Adina Beg in 1758, with large parts being incorporated into Durrani Empire.

Geography
The subah of Lahore was bordered on the south by the Multan Subah and Delhi Subah, to the north by Kashmir Subah, to the west by the Kabul Subah, and to the north east by the semi-autonomous hill states.

History

Establishing Mughal control
In 1519, Babur first crossed the Indus river and took control of the entire Sind Sagar Doab up to Bhera and Khushab and by 1524 he had sacked Lahore. He then appointed representatives to key positions in his newly occupied territories, including Mir Abdul Aziz at Lahore. He went on to take several key hill forts such as Kutila, Harur and Kahlur. By 1526 the whole region from the Indus to the Sutlej was under his control.

After Babur's death, his son Kamran annexed the region up to the Sutlej, an act acquiesced by Humayun based in Delhi. Now lacking resources from the strategically important region, Humayun struggled in his conflict against Sher Shah Suri and fled to Kabul. The region now became part of the Sur Empire.

Sher Shah instituted a policy of populating the region from Nilab to Lahore with Afghans from Roh. Next he launched campaigns against the Gakkhars, about whom he suspected of being friendly with the Mughals. During this period, Sher Shah constructed the Rohtas Fort near Jhelum. Following the death of Sher Shah's successor, Islam Shah. In 1556, the Sur Empire fragmented into four separate and hostile divisions. The Punjab region came under the control of Sikandar Suri who also controlled Delhi and Agra. However Mughal forces under Humayun defeated Sikandar at the Battle of Panipat in 1556 and re-established the Mughal Empire across the Punjab and northern India.

Over the next twenty four year, the Mughals gradually consolidated power in the Punjab. Campaigns followed to subdue local Zamindars, the Hill forts, and remnants of the Afghan establishment. The Gakkhars were co-opted and assimilated into the Mughal polity under Kamal Khan, son of Rai Sarang. In 1566 and 1581 Mirza Hakim, half-brother of Akbar launched unsuccessful campaigns to occupy Lahore.

In 1580, Akbar re-organised his territories into twelve subahs, one of which was the Lahore Subah.

Decline
Following the death of Bahadur Shah in 1712, the Mughal Empire was ruled by a succession of rulers influenced by powerful and competing nobles. The erosion of imperial authority soon impacted the provinces where local rulers began to declare independence. The loss of territory, and failure to exert to military influence over the provinces led to a loss of revenue and financial crisis across the empire. In the Lahore Subah, the tenure of governors increased and began to be seen as a hereditary post. Between 1713 and 1745, the role of governor was held by just two people, father and son, Abdul Samad Khan and Zakariyah Khan.

The death of Zakariyah Khan further hastened the end of Mughal rule in the subah. A conflict between the emperor Muhammad Shah and his wazir, Qamruddin, led to a delay in appointing a replacement governor. Eventually, Qamruddin was made governor of both the Lahore and Multan subahs, and he nominated first Mir Momin Khan and later Yahya Khan to deputise for him as governor in the two subahs.

The absence of a strong administration since Zakariyah Khan's death hindered Yahya Khan.  He was forced to deal with increased raiding by Sikhs and a rebellion by Hayatullah Khan, son of the late Zakariyah Khan. On 21 March 1747 Hayatullah Khan successfully defeated Yayha Khan in battle. The ousting of Yahya Khan was the first instance of a legitimate appointed governor being displaced in the subah. When his attempts to legitimise his position with the Mughal central government failed, Hayatullah Khan allied himself with Ahmad Shah Durrani, Emir of the Durrani Empire. In response, the Mughal government offered to legitimise him and grant him the subahs of Kabul, Kashmir, Thatta, Lahore and Multan if he defeated Durrani, an offer he accepted. In January 1748, Hayatullah Khan was defeated by the Afghans and fled to Delhi.

Having occupied Lahore, the Afghans proceeded to Delhi however were defeated at Sirhind in March 1748. Having seen off the Afghans, the Mughals appointed Moin-ul-Mulk, son of Qamruddin, as governor of Lahore and Multan subahs. Durrani launched a second invasion later in the year resulting in a peace agreement which gave the revenues of the Chahar Mahal, namely Sialkot, Gujrat, Pasrur and Aurangabad to the Afghans. He then faced a rebellion by first Nazir Khan, the Afghan appointed to collect the revenues of the Chahar Mahal, and later Hayatullah Khan, both at the instigation of the Safdar Jung the new Mughal wazir based in Delhi. Despite successfully defeating both rebellions, Muinul Mulk was then attacked by Durrani for his failure to pay the revenues of the Chahar Mahal. Lacking support from the central government in Delhi, he again enlisted Sikh mercenaries who had aided him in his previous two campaigns. The protracted conflict with Abdali led to widespread destruction across the subah and in 1752 Muinul Mulk was finally defeated by Afghan forces. The subah of Lahore was now annexed by the Afghans, however Muinul Mulk was left in place to govern until his death on 4 November 1753.  The Mughals continued to claim authority in the subah and appointed their own governor Mir Momin Khan to challenge Afghan authority, even briefly re-occupying the subah in 1756, however they were quickly defeated. In 1758, the last Governer of the Subah, Adina Beg, sought assistance from Marathas and expelled Afghans from the province. However, his untimely death caused Durrani Empire to again occupy it in 1761.

Government
The subah was ruled by a governor, called a subedar (viceroy). His duties involved maintaining the peace, subduing the northern hill states, hearing cases in court, supervising provincial officers and undertaking works of public utility. Usually a single governor was appointed, however for a brief period during Akbar's reign he appointed two governors in case one came to court or fell ill. Akbar further believed, following his experience with the Atka Khail in the Punjab, that it was necessary to regularly transfer governors to avoid them becoming too powerful. As such, for much of its history, governors only served short terms in the subah.

A diwan was in charge of all financial affairs, and all faujdars, jagirdars, zamindars, amins, karoris and qanungoes, were required to refer revenue matters to the diwan. In 1595 the diwan was made independent of the governor, and placed directly under the control of the diwan-i-ala in the central government.

A provincial bakshi controlled military affairs. He ensured that the mansabdars fulfilled their duties and issued certificates to that effect. The bakshi was also acted as the official news writer of the subah, reporting all affairs to the central government.

In Lahore, the capital of the subah, a qazi was appointed, who heard cases, carried out investigations, and delivered judgments.

Economy
Under the Mughals, the city of Lahore became one of the largest in the medieval world, with population of 400,000 to 700,000 in the 17th century. In contrast, only three cities in Europe had population of more than 200,000 in 1600. In his 1670 epic poem Paradise lost, English poet John Milton made reference to Lahore as one of the most prosperous cities which Adam saw from the hill of Paradise, "To Agra and Lahor of Great Mogul — To seat of Mightiest Empires."

Weaponry
Lahore, along with Delhi, was the most important center of production of military equipment of Mughal empire. In 1757, when the Subah of Lahore came temporarily under control of Ahmed Shah Abdali, the Zamzama cannon was ordered to be cast by Shah Nazir, a metalsmith of the former Mughal viceroy of the Lahore Subah,  Moin-ul-Mulk. This gun was one of the largest ever made in the sub-continent.

Steel manufacturing

Lahore was also a major centre of production of seamless steel, especially the famous Wootz steel. In 17th century, a celestial globe was made by Diya’ ad-din Muhammad in Lahore, 1668. The globe itself was manufactured in one piece, so as to be seamless. This complicated process was, if not invented, then certainly perfected, in the Lahore workshop Diya’ ad-din Muhammad worked in. About twenty such globes were produced in Lahore during the Mughal Empire.

Architecture

The Lahore Subah, particularly the city of Lahore, has large number of Mughal Era monuments. Lahore's prosperity and central position has yielded more Mughal-era monuments in Lahore than either Delhi or Agra. Lahore reached its cultural zenith during this period, with dozens of mosques, tombs, shrines, and urban infrastructure developed during this period. Emperor Jahangir chose to be buried in Lahore, and his tomb was built in Lahore's Shahdara Bagh suburb in 1637 by his wife Nur Jahan, whose tomb is also nearby. His son, Shah Jahan reigned between 1628 and 1658 and was born in Lahore in 1592. He renovated large portions of the Lahore Fort with luxurious white marble and erected the iconic Naulakha Pavilion in 1633. Shah Jahan lavished Lahore with some of its most celebrated and iconic monuments, such as the Shahi Hammam in 1635, and both the Shalimar Gardens and the extravagantly decorated Wazir Khan Mosque in 1641. The largest of Lahore's Mughal monuments was raised during reign of emperor Aurangzeb, the Badshahi Mosque in 1673, as well as the iconic Alamgiri gate of the Lahore Fort in 1674.

Notable governors

The following is a list of notable governors of Lahore subah appointed by the central Mughal government.

16th century
Said Khan
Raja Bhagwan Das
Rai Singh
Khawaja Shamsuddin Khawafi

17th century
Qulij Khan Andajani
Asaf Khan
Wazir Khan
Mutamad Khan
Ali Mardan Khan
Saeed Khan Bahadur
Qulij Khan
Jafar Khan
Dara Shikoh
Khwaja Muin Khan
Bahadur Khan
Izzat Khan

18th century
Abd al-Samad Khan
Zakariyah Khan
Yahya Khan
Moin-ul-Mulk
Mir Momin Khan
Adina Beg, last Mughal governor of Punjab

See also
 Subah of Multan
 History of Punjab

References

Further reading
 
Mughal subahs
History of Lahore
History of Punjab
History of Pakistan
History of India